Countess sequel to Duchess, is a historical romance novel by Josephine Edgar published in 1978 by Macdonald & J. The novel won the 1979's Romantic Novel of the Year Award by the Romantic Novelists' Association.

Plot
Viola Corbett lives amid luxury in Vienna with her husband, Count Eugene Erhmann, their children, Therese and Lorenz, and her illegitimate son James-Carlo, until all collapses with the outbreak of the First World War. A story of greed, lust, and unreasonable hate; but most of all, a captivating romance.

1978 British novels
British romance novels
English novels
Historical romance novels
Novels set during World War I